Elo Gowé (born 13 August 1999) is a New Caledonian international footballer who plays as a defender for New Caledonia Super Ligue side AS Mont-Dore.

Career statistics

International

References

1999 births
Living people
New Caledonian footballers
New Caledonia international footballers
Association football defenders
AS Mont-Dore players